Marko Ranilović (born 25 November 1986) is a Slovenian football goalkeeper who plays for Austrian side SV Union Sturm Klöch.

Honours
Maribor
 Slovenian Championship: 2008–09
 Slovenian Cup: 2009–10
 Slovenian Supercup: 2009

Ferencváros
 Hungarian League Cup: 2012–13

References

External links
 
 Marko Ranilović at ÖFB 

1986 births
Living people
Sportspeople from Maribor
Slovenian footballers
Slovenia youth international footballers
Slovenia under-21 international footballers
Association football goalkeepers
NK Maribor players
Ferencvárosi TC footballers
Kaposvári Rákóczi FC players
NK Zavrč players
HNK Hajduk Split players
FC ViOn Zlaté Moravce players
NK Železničar Maribor players
Slovenian PrvaLiga players
Nemzeti Bajnokság I players
Nemzeti Bajnokság II players
Croatian Football League players
Slovak Super Liga players
Slovenian expatriate footballers
Slovenian expatriate sportspeople in Hungary
Expatriate footballers in Hungary
Slovenian expatriate sportspeople in Croatia
Expatriate footballers in Croatia
Slovenian expatriate sportspeople in Slovakia
Expatriate footballers in Slovakia
Slovenian expatriate sportspeople in Austria
Expatriate footballers in Austria